The Asansol–Patna section is a railway line connecting  in the Indian state of West Bengal and Patna in Bihar. The  line passes through the fringe areas of West Bengal, a portion of Santhal Parganas in Jharkhand and the Gangetic Plain in Bihar.

History
The first rail track between Howrah and Delhi was via what was later named as Sahibganj loop and the first through train on the route was run in 1864. The Kiul–Patna sector was ready around 1862. A "shorter main line" connecting Raniganj and Kiul Junction was in position in 1871 and the opening of the Grand Chord in 1907 shortened the distance from Howrah to Delhi even further.

Electrification
The Asansol–Sitarampur sector was electrified in 1960–61 and the rest of the Asansol–Patna section was electrified during the period 1994–95 to 2000–2001. Sector-wise progress was as follows: Sitarampur–Chittaranjan 1994–95, Chittaranjan–Jamtara 1995–96, Jamtara–Jasidih 1996–97, Jasidih–Narganjo 1997–98, Narganjo–Jhajha 1998–99, Jhajha–Kiul in 1997–98, Kiul–Mankatha 1999–2000, Mankatha–Barhaiya 2000–01, Barhaiya–Mokama 1999–2000 Mokama–Fatuha 1998–99, Fatuha–Danapur 1999–2000.

Speed limit
The entire Sitarampur–Patna–Mughalsarai line is classified as "B Class" line, where trains can run at speeds up to 130 km/h.

Passenger movement

Sheds and workshops
Chittaranjan Locomotive Works, one of the largest electric locomotive manufacturers in the world, is located on this line. Initially started for manufacturing steam locomotives, it went into production on 26 January 1950, the day when India became a republic. It now produces AC and DC locomotives and accessories.

Asansol is home to the oldest electric loco shed of Indian Railways. It houses WAG-5 and WAM-4 electric locomotives.

Railway reorganisation 
In 1952, Eastern Railway,  Northern Railway and North Eastern Railway were formed. Eastern Railway was formed with a portion of East Indian Railway Company, east of Mughalsarai and Bengal Nagpur Railway. Northern Railway was formed with a portion of East Indian Railway Company west of Mughalsarai, Jodhpur Railway, Bikaner Railway and Eastern Punjab Railway. North Eastern Railway was formed with Oudh and Tirhut Railway, Assam Railway and a portion of Bombay, Baroda and Central India Railway. East Central Railway was created in 1996–97.

See also 
Patna–Digha Ghat line

References

External links
Trains at Patna
Trains at Asansol

|

5 ft 6 in gauge railways in India

Rail transport in West Bengal
Rail transport in Jharkhand
Railway lines in Bihar
Transport in Asansol
1871 establishments in India